Hiram I (Phoenician: 𐤇𐤓𐤌  Ḥirōm "my brother is exalted"; Hebrew:  Ḥīrām, Modern Arabic: حيرام, also called Hirom or Huram)
was the Phoenician king of Tyre according to the Hebrew Bible. His regnal years have been calculated by some as 980 to 947 BC, in succession to his father, Abibaal. Hiram was succeeded as king of Tyre by his son Baal-Eser I. Hiram is also mentioned in the writings of Menander of Ephesus (early 2nd century BC), as preserved in Josephus's Against Apion, which adds to the biblical account. According to Josephus, Hiram lived for 53 years and reigned 34.

Reign
During Hiram's reign, Tyre grew from a satellite of Sidon into the most important of Phoenician cities, and the holder of a large trading empire. He suppressed the rebellion of the first Tyrean colony at Utica, near the later site of Carthage (Against Apion i:18).

The Hebrew Bible says that he allied himself with David, king of the United Kingdom of Israel and his artisans built David's palace in Jerusalem after his capture of the city. The palace was built using Lebanon Cedar. After David's death, Hiram maintained his alliance with David's son and successor Solomon, again as an equal ("אחי", meaning "my brother") Through the alliance with Solomon, Hiram ensured himself access to the major trade routes to Egypt, Arabia and Mesopotamia. The two kings also jointly opened a trade route over the Red Sea, connecting the Israelite harbour of Ezion-Geber with a land called Ophir. Some schools of thought suggest that this land of Ophir was in the port city of Sopara near modern Mumbai (Bombay), India.

According to the Bible, both kings grew rich through this trade, and Hiram sent Solomon architects, workmen, cedar wood, and gold to build the First Temple in Jerusalem. Josephus says that he also extended the Tyrean harbour, enlarged the city by joining the two islands on which it was built, and constructed a royal palace and a temple for Melqart (Against Apion i:17). Modern archaeology, however, has found no evidence for these expansions.

Hypotheses regarding chronology of reign

The beginning date of Hiram's reign is derived from a statement by Josephus by citing both Tyrian court records and the writings of Menander, relating that 143 years passed between the start of construction of Solomon's Temple until the founding of Carthage (or until Dido's flight that led to its founding). Josephus also related that Hiram's reign began 155 years and 8 months before that event and that construction of Solomon's Temple began in the twelfth year of Hiram's reign, which would be 143 years before the building of Carthage.

As pointed out by William Barnes (1801–1886), the date for the start of Temple construction using the Tyrian data is derived "wholly independently" of the way that date is derived by using the Scriptural data.

"Tomb of Hiram"

The "Tomb of Hiram" (Qabr Hiram) dates from the Persian period, four to six centuries after the presumed time of Hiram. It is built 6 km southeast of Tyre, near the village of Hanaouay, on the road to Qana and has the form of a colossal limestone sarcophagus on a pedestal.

In modern fiction
King Hiram is a character in the time travel story Ivory, and Apes, and Peacocks (1983) by Poul Anderson.

Namesakes 
In 1829, the Town of Tyre was formed in Seneca County in the state of New York and the choice of its name was presumably inspired by ancient Tyre, according to the Town Historian. Likewise, its Hiram Lay Cobblestone Farmhouse, which is on the National Register of Historic Places, was apparently named after the Phoenician king.

In the Southern Lebanese city of Tyre there is a neighbourhood called Hay Hiram, located in Tyre's northern municipality of Abassiyat. Hiram Hospital is based in that neighbourhood and nearby there is a Hiram Pharmacy. In the centre of Tyre's Sour municipality main street is named after Hiram (spelled Hyram on Google Maps). Hiram Street suffers from high traffic congestion, air and noise pollution.

See also
 List of kings of Tyre
 Pygmalion for discussion of date of founding of Carthage used by Menander

References

Monarchs of the Hebrew Bible
Kings of Tyre
10th-century BC rulers
People from Tyre, Lebanon
1000 BC births
940s BC deaths
10th-century BC Phoenician people
Ophir